Daniel Boyle is a Scottish screenwriter best known for devising the television series Hamish Macbeth and writing twelve episodes of the show.

Boyle left school at fifteen and for the next eleven years worked as a seaman. He left the sea and became a postman for four years before going to university as a mature student. After university his main occupation was as a college lecturer. He became a full-time writer in 1990, writing extensively for television, had four original films produced, and contributed episodes to series Inspector Morse, Rebus, Hamish Macbeth, Taggart and Lewis.

Boyle is married and has three children and four grandchildren.

Screenplays 

Scripts currently seeking production:
 ‘Mary Dogood.’ Three part series for TV. Black comedy
 ‘Maurice, Lee, and JFK.’ Ten part series for TV plus second series on assassination of JFK and aftermath.
 ‘Loving Burns.’ Feature. Factional bio of the Scottish poet.
 ‘Illusion.’ Three part TV series featuring Glasgow based PI John Paris.
 ‘The Satan Gene.’ Feature. US based thriller.
 ‘Dancing At The Shore.’ Feature. Comedy set in West of Scotland 1960’s dance hall.
 ‘The Road From Ardcranna.’ Three part TV drama based on Highland Clearances.

Books 
 Mary Dogood 
 Illusion 
 The Road From Ardcranna

References

External links 
 
 Daniel Boyle on LinkedIn
 Daniel Boyle on Smashwords

Living people
British male television writers
Scottish screenwriters
Scottish television writers
Year of birth missing (living people)
21st-century Scottish dramatists and playwrights
21st-century Scottish writers
20th-century Scottish dramatists and playwrights